Meirion James Trow (born 16 October 1949) is a Welsh author of crime fiction, who writes under the name M. J. Trow. He has written mysteries featuring Inspector Lestrade, Peter Maxwell, Kit Marlowe and Margaret Murray.

Biography

Trow was born in Ferndale, Rhondda Cynon Taff, Wales. He went to Warwick School from 1961 to 1968. In 1968 he went to King's College London to read history. After graduation he spent a year at Jesus College, Cambridge. From 1972 he was a history teacher in Welwyn Garden City in Hertfordshire. On 14 July 1973 he married Carol Mary Long and in 1976 moved to the Isle of Wight where he worked as a teacher of History and Politics at Ryde High School. Trow is a member of the Society of Authors and of the Crime Writers' Association.

Trow is also known in some circles for his work in theatre and dramas, organising and participating in many performances.

Earlier in 2008 he appeared on the Channel 4 show Richard & Judy talking about his book Spartacus: The Myth and the Man.

Works

Fiction
Trow has written over 50 fiction books, in three main series.

'Inspector Lestrade' books, based on the character from the Sherlock Holmes stories.

'Peter Maxwell', featuring a teacher and amateur sleuth. 
 Maxwell's House (1994)
 Maxwell's Flame (1995)
 Maxwell's Movie (1997)
 Maxwell's War (1999)
 Maxwell's Ride (2000)
 Maxwell's Curse (2000)
 Maxwell's Reunion (2001)
 Maxwell's Match (2002)
 Maxwell's Inspection (2003)
 Maxwell's Grave (2004)
 Maxwell's Mask (2005)
 Maxwell's Point (2007)
 Maxwell's Chain (2008)
 Maxwell's Revenge (2009)
 Maxwell's Retirement (2010)
 Maxwell's Island (2011)
 Maxwell's Crossing (2012)
 Maxwell's Return (2014)
 Maxwell's Academy (2015)
 Maxwell's Summer (2020)
 Maxwell's Zoom (2022)

'Kit Marlowe', featuring the playwright and poet as detective. 
 Dark Entry (2011)
 Silent Court (2011)
 Witch Hammer (2012)
 Scorpions's Nest (2012)
 Crimson Rose (2013)
 Traitor's Storm (2014)
 Secret World (2015)
 Eleventh Hour (2017)
 Queen's Progress (2018)
 Black Death (2019)
 The Reckoning (2020)

The Kit Marlowe series is published by Severn House.

‘Margaret Murray’, featuring a great feminist.

 Four Thousand Days (2021)

Other work

'Britannia' (co-written with Richard Denham), set in Sub-Roman Britain. 
 Part I: The Wall (2014)
 Part II: The Watchmen (2014)
 Part III: The Warlords (2016)
 World of Britannia: Historical Companion to the Britannia Series (2016)

Non-fiction
Let Him Have It, Chris (1990), on which the film Let Him Have It (1991) was based
The Wigwam Murder, based on the August Sangret case. (1994, republished by T Squared Books in 2016)
The Many Faces of Jack the Ripper (1997)
Who Killed Kit Marlowe?: a Contract to Murder in Elizabethan England (2001)
Vlad the Impaler: in Search of the Real Dracula (2003)
Boudicca (2004)
Cnut: Emperor of the North (2005)
Spartacus: the Myth and the Man (2006)
The Pocket Hercules (2006)
El Cid: the Making of a Legend (2007)
War Crimes: Underworld Britain in the Second World War (2008)
A Brief History of Vampires (2010)
Ripper Hunter: Abberline and the Whitechapel Murders (2012)
A Brief History of Cleopatra (2013)

References

External links
Britannia series official website
M. J. Trow at Fantastic Fiction
T Squared Books official website

1949 births
Living people
People from Ferndale, Rhondda Cynon Taf
Welsh novelists
Welsh crime novelists
People educated at Warwick School
Alumni of King's College London